is a collection of kabuki plays strongly associated with the Onoe Kikugorō line of kabuki actors. Akin to the Kabuki Jūhachiban ("Kabuki Eighteen") of the Ichikawa Danjūrō lineage, the compilation of the Shinko engeki jisshu was begun by Onoe Kikugorō V and completed by his son Onoe Kikugorō VI.

These represent the greatest plays of the Bakumatsu (c. 1853–1867) and Meiji periods (1868-1912), and many were written by Kawatake Mokuami the most celebrated playwright today of that period. The premiere of each of these plays featured either Kikugorō V, his grandfather Onoe Kikugorō III, or his son Kikugorō VI, and the Onoe family continues to dominate the leading roles in these plays today.

The Ten
Rakan
Kodera no Neko
Tsuchigumo
Ibaraki
Hitotsuya
Modoribashi
Kikujidō
Hagoromo (play)
Migawari Zazen
Osakabe Hime

Rakan and Kodera no Neko were performed first by Kikugorō III; Migawari Zazen and Osakabe Hime were added to the list by Kikugorō VI.

References
Shōriya, Aragorō. "Kabuki Glossary S~T." Kabuki21.com. Accessed 30 May 2009.

Kabuki plays